Ahneby is a municipality in Schleswig-Flensburg district, in northern Germany.

References

Schleswig-Flensburg